Sunny Side Up may refer to:
 Sunny side up, method of fried egg preparation

Film and television
Sunny Side Up (1926 film), American silent comedy from DeMille Pictures
Sunny Side Up (1929 film), American Movietone musical from Fox
Sunnyside Up, late 1950s and early 1960s TV variety program in Melbourne, Australia
Sunny Side Up (TV series) or The Sunny Side Up Show, American children's morning show on Sprout

Sunny side up Singaporean tv social drama tv series

Music
Sunny Side Up (Lou Donaldson album) (American, 1960)
Sunny Side Up (Paolo Nutini album) (Scottish, 2009)
"Sunny Side Up", section of English rock band Pink Floyd's 1970 instrumental Alan's Psychedelic Breakfast
"Sunny Side Up", 2015 song by American rock band Faith No More
"Sunny Side Up!", 2019 song by Korean girl group Red Velvet

Other
Sunny Side Up, 2011 American character doll manufactured by Lalaloopsy

See also
Sunny Side Up Tropical Festival, annual music festival in Bali, Indonesia
Sunnyside (disambiguation)